Tubes is the second-highest peak of the Mecsek mountain range in Hungary. Its elevation is 611 metres above sea level. The peak's name probably derives from "tuba", a Hungarian word for wild dove.

The peak sites a military radar station and a look-out tower as well. The 22 metre-high tower was completed in 2001 and provides a clear view in  every direction. In 2005, the Hungarian government chose Tubes as the site for a 3D NATO military radar, however, due to civil resistance, the project was developed in Tolna county.

References

Mountains of Hungary